Caeau Llety-cybi is a Site of Special Scientific Interest in Ceredigion,  west Wales. The lowland meadow site is managed by the Wildlife Trust of South & West Wales.

The reserve consists of four small herb-rich fields of neutral grassland showing some acidic characteristics. Sward species include sweet vernal grass, common bent, and Heath-grass with a wealth of flowers, such as Bird's-foot trefoil, Black knapweed, Burnet saxifrage, Cat's ear, Ivy-leaved bellflower, Pignut, Red clover, Tormentil, Betony and Greater butterfly orchid.

The site has waxcap fungi, probably encouraged by a lack of ploughing.

See also
List of Sites of Special Scientific Interest in Ceredigion

References

Sites of Special Scientific Interest in Ceredigion